Located in a geologically active region, New Zealand has numerous geothermal features, including volcanoes, hot springs, geysers and volcanic lakes. Many of these features cluster together geographically, notably throughout the central North Island's Taupo Volcanic Zone. These areas attract scientific interest and tourism;  power generators,  industry and civil engineering also utilise them.

Tourist areas
Whakarewarewa, Rotorua

 Tikitere (Hell's Gate), north of Rotorua
Waimangu, south of Rotorua

Waiotapu, south of Rotorua

Craters of the Moon, Wairakei, north of Taupo

Orakei Korako, north of Taupo

See also
Geothermal power in New Zealand
Hot springs in New Zealand

References

 
Geology of New Zealand
Tourist attractions in New Zealand